Mazie may refer to:


People
 Bob Mazie (1938–2017), American college football coach
 Mazie (given name), a variant of Maisie

Places
 Mazie, Kentucky, an unincorporated community
 Mazie, Oklahoma, a census-designated place

Other uses
 "Mazie", a cat, the first live mascot of the New Hampshire Wildcats, between 1927 and 1929

See also
 Maisi (disambiguation)
 Maisie (disambiguation)
 Maisy Series, a series of books by Lucy Cousins
 Maisy, a 1999 British TV series based on the books